Mia Hägg (born 1970, Umeå) is a Swedish architect running a practice in Paris, France called Habiter Autrement (HA).

Early career
After completing her studies on Chalmers University of Technology in Gothenburg and École nationale supérieure d'architecture de Paris-Belleville in Paris, she collaborated with Ateliers Jean Nouvel from 1998 through 2001 on various projects including the Shiodome Project in Tokyo, Japan, and the Quai Branly Museum in Paris.

Her collaboration with Herzog & de Meuron began in 2002. In 2003, she became Project Manager for the National Stadium of the 2008 Olympic Games in Beijing. In 2005 she became an Associate of the firm. As Associate, Mia Hägg was in charge of various projects and large scale competitions in the France, Switzerland, Russia and the United States.

Recent work
In January 2007, she left Herzog & de Meuron to found Habiter Autrement.  That same year the office was rewarded first prize
by for five upscalehousing projects (130 units) in Bordeaux in collaboration with Ateliers Jean Nouvel (AJN) and
ING Real Estate. Together with AJN, Habiter Autrement was also appointed a direct commission for a large Master Plan including 2000 housing units, commercial and public equipments in Toledo, Spain., currently under construction. The office was selected by Jacques Herzog to participate in the Ordos 100 to design a 1000 sqm villa in inner Mongolia in collaboration with the Swiss office SKA, see further on the project webpage: . During 2008 Habiter Autrement was invited to develop a proposal for the main traffic hub of Stockholm, Slussen, in collaboration with AJN.

Habiter Autrement is currently working on 42 housing units at the Entrepôt MacDonalds based on a Master Plan developed by OMA. In 2009 Habiter Autrement was commissioned to develop and energy project «the Energy Systems » for the city of Stockholm. The same year the office received a direct commission for a covered stadium in Toledo.
In 2010 the office was invited to develop a 50 ha Master Plan proposal including a 10 ha park in the 17th arrondissement of Paris, Clichy Batignolles.
Commissions in 2011 include an urban competence centre in the harbour of Bordeaux and stadium and Master plan study for Djugården IF in Stockholm, Sweden. Always interested in collaborations, Mia Hägg invited Barcode Architects in Rotterdam as working partner on the last two projects.

Notes

1970 births
Living people
Swedish architects
Swedish women architects